The Colombo World Trade Centre Bombing was a terrorist attack which occurred on 15 October 1997 and was carried out by the LTTE during the separatist civil war in Sri Lanka between the government and the Tamil Tigers.

Attack
Shortly before 7:00 am on 15 October 1997 a group of up to six fighters from the LTTE’s Black Tigers drove a truck laden with approximately  explosives into the car park of the Galadari Hotel, a five-star luxury hotel, located in the heart of Colombo’s business and government district, where they shot and killed four unarmed security guards. They then detonated the explosives by firing an RPG at the truck. The terrorists, armed with assault rifles, disbursed and made their way into nearby government buildings and the five-story building that houses Sri Lanka's state-run newspapers where they fought security forces for several hours until they were either killed, or blew themselves up, or ingested cyanide pills.

The Galadari Hotel car park is located adjacent to the western tower of the Colombo World Trade Centre, two 39-storey office towers that housed the Colombo Stock Exchange and the Information Ministry at the time. Since the Colombo World Trade Centre was inaugurated a few days before, it was suspected to be the main target of the LTTE. Damage to the hotel and nearby buildings, including the Hilton Hotel and the World Trade Centre, was heavy but not structurally catastrophic. The blast destroyed 30 cars in the Galadari parking lot and shattered all the hotel’s windows as well as the windows on all the nearby buildings.

The attack killed fifteen people, including an Assistant Superintendent of Police in the Criminal Investigations Department, Nissanka Dharmaratne, a police constable, an Army Commando and the Viharadhipathi (Chief Priest) of the Sambuddhaloka Vihara, Ven. Vitharandeniye Thera. There were 105 were wounded including 31 tourists of which seven were US citizens. 

The government set aside a $25 million assistance package for all buildings damaged in the attack, with the Galadari Hotel reopening in January 1998 and the World Trade Center in June of the same year.

See also
 Colombo Central Bank bombing
 1993 World Trade Center bombing

References

External links 
Galadari a Commemoration 

Suicide bombings in 1997
20th century in Colombo
Attacks on civilians attributed to the Liberation Tigers of Tamil Eelam
Car and truck bombings in Sri Lanka
Massacres in Sri Lanka
Liberation Tigers of Tamil Eelam attacks in Eelam War III
Mass murder in 1997
Mass murder of Sinhalese
October 1997 events in Asia
October 1997 crimes
Suicide bombings in Sri Lanka
Terrorist incidents in Sri Lanka in 1997
Building bombings in Sri Lanka
World Trade Centers
Terrorist incidents in Colombo